The C5 Metro Rail Transit Line 10, also known as MRT Line 10 or MRT-10, is a proposed rapid transit line in the Philippines. The line would run along the Circumferential Road 5 (C5), with a terminus at the Ninoy Aquino International Airport (NAIA), and another terminus in Commonwealth Avenue with  a possible interchange with MRT7 at Tandang Sora Station. The line would then run from Commonwealth Avenue through Katipunan Avenue, where there may be a possible interchange with LRT Line 2 at the Aurora Station in Katipunan Avenue. The line would then continue to NAIA along the aforementioned Circumferential Road 5. The planned location of the Line's Train Depot would be on UP Diliman Property in Diliman, Quezon City.

The project is expected to cost  ₱92.58 billion, and is currently waiting approval of the relevant approving bodies.

Stations 
Line 10 would have 16 stations. The known stations are as follows:

References 

Rapid transit in the Philippines
Metro Manila